Trichosarcina is a genus of green algae in the order Ulotrichales. Filoprotococcus was once regarded as a synonym. However, Filoprotococcus is now considered valid in its own right. Trichosarcina is considered to be of uncertain validity.

, AlgaeBase accepted only one species, Trichosarcina polymorpha. Its life cycle includes a uniseriate, Hormidium-like phase; a pluriseriate stage, and, finally, a chain of sarcinoid packets which may dissociate. The cells are uninucleate, with a parietal chloroplast and single pyrenoid. Quadriflagellate zoospores are produced by cells of the pluriseriate and sarcinoid stages.

References

Further reading

Thompson, Rufus H., and Daniel E. Wujek. "The Identity of Filoprotococcus and Trichosarcina (Chlorophyta) in Kansas." Transactions of the Kansas Academy of Science (1903) (1996): 152–156.

Ulvophyceae genera
Ulotrichales
Monotypic algae genera